331st may refer to:

331st Air Expeditionary Group, inactive United States Air Force unit
331st Fighter-Interceptor Squadron, former unit of the United States Air Force 
331st Guards Airborne Regiment, formation of the Russian Airborne Troops, part of the 98th Guards Airborne Division
330th Rifle Division (Soviet Union), former infantry division of the Red Army in summer 1941

See also
331 (number)
331, the year 331 (CCCXXXI) of the Julian calendar